Carnelli is an Italian surname. Notable people with the surname include:

 Lorenzo Carnelli  (1887 – 1960), Uruguayan lawyer and politician 
 María Luisa Carnelli (1898 –1987), Argentine writer, poet, and journalist

See also 

 Carnelli (disambiguation)

Italian-language surnames